House at 176 Prospect Avenue is a historic home located at Sea Cliff in Nassau County, New York.  It was built in 1886 and is a -story, clapboard residence with a cross-gable, slate-covered roof in the Queen Anne style.  It features a 3-story square tower with a hipped roof and board and batten cornice.

It was listed on the National Register of Historic Places in 1988.

References

Houses on the National Register of Historic Places in New York (state)
Queen Anne architecture in New York (state)
Houses completed in 1886
Houses in Nassau County, New York
National Register of Historic Places in Nassau County, New York